The Seto Building at 4-1435 Kuhio Highway in Kapaa, Kauai, was earlier known as the Quality Market and then the Big Save Building. It was built in 1929 to serve as the first general food market on the island of Kauai, with the latest refrigeration methods to store a variety of fresh meat and produce. Its owner, Ah Doi Seto, had immigrated from China in 1888 to work on a sugarcane plantation, but later left the plantation to open a business in bustling Kapaa. The building is significant as an unusual example of modern commercial architecture with Chinese design elements, but also as a forerunner of contemporary supermarkets. It was listed on the National Register of Historic Places in 1979.

References

Commercial buildings on the National Register of Historic Places in Hawaii
Hawaiian architecture
Buildings and structures in Kauai County, Hawaii
Retail buildings in Hawaii
National Register of Historic Places in Kauai County, Hawaii
1929 establishments in Hawaii
Commercial buildings completed in 1929